Jochen Sachse (born 2 October 1948 in Frankenberg, Saxony) is an East German former track and field athlete who competed mainly in the hammer throw.

He competed for East Germany in the 1972 Summer Olympics held in Munich, Germany in the hammer throw where he won the silver medal.

References

External links
 
 
 
 
 

1948 births
Living people
People from Frankenberg, Saxony
German male hammer throwers
East German male hammer throwers
Olympic athletes of East Germany
Olympic silver medalists for East Germany
Athletes (track and field) at the 1972 Summer Olympics
Athletes (track and field) at the 1976 Summer Olympics
European Athletics Championships medalists
Medalists at the 1972 Summer Olympics
Olympic silver medalists in athletics (track and field)
Universiade medalists in athletics (track and field)
Universiade gold medalists for East Germany
Medalists at the 1970 Summer Universiade
Sportspeople from Saxony
People from Bezirk Karl-Marx-Stadt